Wrexham Excelsior were a football club who played in the Welsh Cup in 1886–87, and 1887–88 season. The football club are first mentioned in 1884, and are presumed to have folded around 1895.

Cup History

References

Sport in Wrexham
Sport in Wrexham County Borough
Defunct football clubs in Wales
Football clubs in Wrexham